Ason (朝臣) was a prestigious hereditary noble title in Japan, used mainly between Asuka and Heian periods.

Ason, ASON and orthographic variants may also refer to:

Israeli culture
 Ason Hanun-dalet, the 1977 Israeli CH-53 crash that killed 54
 Zihuy Korbanot Ason (ZAKA), a disaster victim relief and identification organisation

Places

Philippines
 Ason, a barangay in Garchitorena, Camarines Sur, Philippines
 Bal-ason, a barangay in Gingoog, Philippines

Spain
 Asón, Cantabria, a town in Arredondo, Cantabria, Spain
 Asón (river), Catalonia, Spain
 Asón-Agüera, the valley  of the Asón River, Cantabria, Spain
 Collados del Asón Natural Park, Cantabria, Spain

Other places
 Ason, two settlements in Myanmar
 Asan, Kathmandu, a ceremonial, market and residential square in Kathmandu, Nepal
 Åsön, former name of the island of Södermalm in Stockholm, Sweden

Physical sciences and technology
 Automatically switched optical network (nowadays Automatic switched-transport network)
 asON, antisense oligonucleotide

People
 Ason (fl. about 1845), a Chinese martial artists, teacher(s) of Kokan Oyadomari
 Ason, Ason Jones and Ason Unique, aliases of the US rapper Ol' Dirty Bastard (1968–2004)
 Ason Kidd, nickname of US basketballer Jason Kidd (born 1973)

Characters
 A character in the Philippine sitcom Home Along Da Riles
 A character in the Philippine-Malaysian soap opera Muli

Other
 Ason, a ritual rattle wielded by the highest level of initiation manbo (priestesses) and oungan (priests) in Haitian Vodou ceremonies
 "Ason Jones", song by US rapper Raekwon on Only Built 4 Cuban Linx... Pt. II
 Ason, Luming at Teresing, a book in Philippine Children's Television Foundation's Karapatan Ng Bata series
 Inmobiliaria Asón SA, a Spanish real estate company involved with the Torre Picasso
 Naviera Ason SA, a Spanish shipping company; see MV Ranga

See also